L'Alliance Française French Film Festival is an annual French film festival in Australia organised by Alliance Française. With the intention of highlighting the richness and diversity of French cinema, the festival supports a selection of 35+ new, French films every year.

The Alliance Française

The Alliance Française was founded in 1883 in Paris, by writers and academics including Jules Verne and Louis Pasteur with the intention of promoting and encouraging a love of French language and culture around the world. Shortly thereafter in 1886, Alliances begun to open abroad in cities including Barcelona, Senegal, Mauritius and Mexico.

Today there are 1040 Alliance Françaises in 136 countries, each operating as independent, local, not-for-profit organisations. In Australia there are currently 30 Alliance Françaises open and operating.

The French Film Industry in Australia

As one of the worlds most dynamic film industries, over 300 French films are released commercially each year, including co-productions. This level of production is assisted by significant investment from the government and community bodies including the cinema agency of the Ministry of Culture and Communication, CNC, tax revenue from cinema tickets as well as TV stations investing in film production.

In Australia, there has been a strong growth in demand for French films, with more than 3.5 million admissions in 2012, as compared to less than 500,000 in 2005.

In comparison to other nations, in Australia French films are the fourth most popular, preceded only by English language films from the US, UK and Australia. Each year, between 25 and 32 French films are sold to Australian distributors for commercial release, not including films released on DVD. Across television, SBS buys the rights to distribute over 70 French films annually for broadcast on free-to-air TV, and generally screens one or two French films per week.

The Festival

The Alliance Française French Film Festival is jointly organised by the Alliance Française of Sydney, Melbourne, Brisbane, Canberra, Perth and Adelaide and is supported by the French Embassy.

As one of the main French cultural events and one of the largest film festivals in Australia the festival showcases the best of contemporary French cinema with genres including action, romance, comedy, thrillers, children's films, animation and documentaries.

Since its inception, 33 festivals have been hosted attracting over 170,000 patrons every year.

Films are shown at a number of cinemas across the country including: Palace Cinemas, Hayden Orpheum, Greater Union Cinema, NFSA, Centro, Cinema Paradiso, Luna on Essex and Windsor Cinema.

Over the course of its lifetime, The Alliance Française French Film festival has also hosted a number of honourable special guests including:

 Catherine Deneuve 
 Gérard Jugnot 
 Jean-Pierre Jeunet 
 Jan Kounen
 Igor Stravinsky 
 Philippe Lioret 
 Clotilde Hesme 
 Rémi Bezançon 
 Inna Modja
 Rebecca Zlotowski 
 Emmanuelle Bercot

See also
Cinema of France

External links
The Alliance Francaise French Film Festival
Alliance Française
Alliance Française de Sydney
Alliance Française de Melbourne
Alliance Française de Brisbane
Alliance Française de Perth
Alliance Française de Canberra
Alliance Française d'Adelaide
La France en Australie

Film festivals in Australia
Alliance Française
French-Australian culture